Yuri Poluneev (born 1956 in Odessa, Soviet Union) is international economist, member of the Royal Institute of International Affairs (Chatham House), professional with significant experience in board governance (more than 16 years, including the board of a major international financial organisation), international financial institutions, central banking and economic policy; long-time lecturer in international economics at Kiev State University Institute for International Relations.

Former member and deputy head of the supervisory board (Council) of the National Bank of Ukraine (2008-2015). Ex-member of Ukraine's parliament (2007-2012).   
Expertise: developmental economics, competitiveness strategies, monetary policy, bank and financial sector regulation and supervision, anti-crisis laws in the financial sector,  bank non-performing debt restructuring, creditor and consumer rights, deposit insurance, consumer credit, financial consumer protection. Was the author or co-author of more than 40 law drafts,  many of which became an important part of the financial reform agenda (bank debt restructuring, creditor and financial consumer rights, state deposit insurance fund, state lottery regulatory regime).

As an economist, Dr. Yuri Poluneev put forward and promoted a concept that a country's strong international competitiveness should become a “national idea” for many emerging markets, particularly for Ukraine   He developed an original economic concept “Technology for Economic Breakthrough” based on the IMD World Competitiveness Yearbook methodology, which maps in detail the "technology" to translate a country's competitiveness rating into the economic policy objectives. Researched extensively the impact of Ukraine crisis upon the country's long-term economic prospects.  
He served as a member of Council of the National Bank of Ukraine and a member of the Committee for Economic Reform.

Education and research

Yuri Poluneev graduated in 1978 from Kiev State University with BA in International Economy, English and Arabic languages. He is also a graduate of one-year international management programme at Toronto University (1991-1992) as well as of short-term course on management accounting and finance in 2000 at London Business School. He holds a PhD degree in International Economics from the Kiev State University (1986). Was awarded honorary title "Merited Economist" (2010).  Fellow of the International Academy of Management (Barcelona).
He authored and co-authored 13 books and more than 100 publications on various aspects of transition economy reforms, country competitiveness, banking and finance. Editor-in-chief of the journal “Monitor of Competitiveness” (2006-2008), which promoted the competitiveness as a top economic policy priority.

Professional career 

In 2005-2007, Yuri Poluneev served as President of the oldest MBA school in Ukraine, International Management Institute (MIM-Kyiv).  During that period, he also was a member of the UNECE Team of Specialists on Innovation and Competitiveness Policies (TOS-ICP).

During 1996-2005, served as a member of the board of directors (executive director) at the European Bank for Reconstruction and Development (the EBRD), a multilateral financial institution based in London, representing five sovereign Bank shareholders - Ukraine, Romania, Moldova, Georgia and Armenia.

In 1996, served as a deputy head of economic department in the Administration of the President of Ukraine. During 1994-1996, Yuri Poluneev was assistant Director General for Programmes at the International Committee for Economic Reform & Cooperation (Bonn, Germany) where he developed and implemented programmes for cooperation and investment in the Newly Independent States of the former Soviet Union.

In 1989-1994, worked as deputy director general for the International Management Institute (MIM-Kyiv), was a visiting professor at the Johnson Graduate School of Management, Cornell University (Ithaca, New York, USA) and served as a consultant for the OECD FDI Advisory Group for Ukraine and Belarus. Co-authored two pioneering OECD country investments reviews for Ukraine (1993) and Belarus (1994).

In 1978-1983 and in 1985-1989, he worked as a research fellow at the Institute of Social and Economic Problems of Foreign Countries (Ukrainian SSR Academy of Sciences). In 1983-1985, served as analyst and interpreter of English and Arabic in the Office of the Economic Advisor to the USSR Embassy in Iraq.

Social activities and personal profile

In 2005, Yuri Poluneev founded an NGO “Council on Competitiveness of Ukraine”.  It mobilized prominent personalities from various venues of life with the mission to initiate the public discussion involving authorities, business, civil society and education (research) as well as mass media to elevate competitiveness to the forefront of public awareness and policy-making in Ukraine. By 2008, the competitiveness theory has formally become an integral part of the government economic policy setting and strategic thinking. He had also focused on the reform in the financial consumer protection by preparing with the USAID assistance a number of new draft legislation focusing on consumer credit and consumer protection in accordance with the OECD guidelines.

Yuri Poluneev was a member of the board of the British Ukrainian Society  and had been an active promoter of closer political and business links between the two countries, especially when served as a co-chairman of the UK-Ukraine Inter-Parliamentary Group (2007-2012).

Poluneev actively contributed to charitable activities. From proceeds of sale of his own music album, he founded the charity “Music – to Children” (2004), which provided financing and assistance to teach disabled children fine arts and music.

Yuri Poluneev speaks fluent English, Ukrainian and Russian. Has a good knowledge of German, reads Arabic. He is married and has four children.

References

External links
 Who's who in Ukraine
 Personal Page at the Parliament website
in Ukrainian

Living people
1956 births
Writers from Odesa
Taras Shevchenko National University of Kyiv alumni
Chatham House people
Ukrainian bankers
21st-century Ukrainian economists
Independent politicians of Yulia Tymoshenko Bloc
Party of Regions politicians
Sixth convocation members of the Verkhovna Rada
Politicians from Odesa
20th-century Ukrainian economists